Vanessa may refer to:

Arts and entertainment
 Vanessa (Millais painting), an 1868 painting by Pre-Raphaelite artist John Everett Millais
 Vanessa, a 1933 novel by Hugh Walpole
 Vanessa, a 1952 instrumental song written by Bernie Wayne and performed by Hugo Winterhalter
 Vanessa, a song by Grimes and d'Eon from Darkbloom
 Vanessa (opera), a Samuel Barber opera that premiered in 1958
 Vanessa (1977 film), a 1977 West German film featuring Olivia Pascal
 Vanessa (Mexican TV series), 1982 Mexican telenovela starring Lucía Méndez
 Vanessa (UK TV series), British talk show presented by Vanessa Feltz
 Vanessa, former name of Canadian television channel Vivid TV

People
 Vanessa (name), a female given name and list of persons named Vanessa
 Esther Vanhomrigh, for whom Jonathan Swift coined the name

Fictional characters 
 Vanessa (King of Fighters), a character in SNK Playmore's The King of Fighters video game series
 Vanessa (Symphogear), a character in the anime series Symphogear
 Vanessa, a character in the Nickelodeon sitcom Ned's Declassified School Survival Guide
 Vanessa, the alias of Disney's The Little Mermaid character Ursula in the 1989 film
 Vanessa, daughter of Heinz Doofenshmirtz from Phineas and Ferb an animated show premiered in 2007
 Vanessa Geraldine Carlysle, known as Copycat in Marvel Comics and the 2016 film Deadpool
 Vanessa Lewis, in the Japanese video game series Virtua Fighter
 Vanessa Woodfield, in the British television series Emmerdale
Vanessa Taylor, long-lost daughter of Maggie Lockwood-Campbell of Chicago Med who debuted in its sixth season.

Other
 Vanessa (butterfly), a genus of butterflies
 Vanessa, Ontario,  a hamlet in Norfolk County, Ontario, Canada
 , the name of more than one ship of the British Royal Navy

See also
 Nessa (disambiguation), a shortening of the name Vanessa